Ireland competed at the 2012 Summer Paralympics in London, United Kingdom from August 29 to September 9, 2012. There are 49 participants representing Ireland at the games, competing across ten sports.

These were the best Paralympics for Ireland since 1988 Summer Paralympics in Seoul, South Korea winning 13 gold, 11 silver, and 18 bronze. For its efforts the Team was presented with a People of the Year Award in September 2012.

Medallists

| width="78%" align="left" valign="top" |

| width="22%" align="left" valign="top" |

Key Moments
On 1 September, Paralympics Ireland celebrated one of their most successful days at any Paralympic Games by earning three gold medals. Of these gold medals, two were world record breaking performances.  retained his Men's 100 metres T13 title, by breaking his own world record with a time of 10.46 seconds, making him the fastest Paralympian in the world over 100 metres. The same day,  set a new world best of 1.57.22 in the Men's 800 metres T32 race, also retaining his win in Beijing.
On 2 September,  accompanied by pilot , won Paralympics Ireland's first ever cycling medal of any colour at the Paralympic Games.

Athletics

Boccia

Individual events

Pairs and team events

Cycling

Equestrian 

Individual

Team

{|class=wikitable
|-
!rowspan="2"|Athlete
!rowspan="2"|Horse
!rowspan="2"|Event
!colspan="3"|Individual Score
!colspan="2"|Total
|-
!
!
!Total
!Score
!Rank
|-
|Eilish Byrne
|rowspan=4|''See above
|rowspan=4|Team
|align="center"|67.714
|align="center"|73.429
|align="center"|141.143*
|align="center" rowspan="4"|428.313
|align="center" rowspan="4"|
|-
|James Dwyer|align="center"|69.719
|align="center"|68.516
|align="center"|138.235*
|-
|Helen Kearney|align="center"|72.235
|align="center"|76.700
|align="center"|148.935*
|-
|Geraldine Savage|align="center"|68.000
|align="center"|68.800
|align="center"|136.800
|}* Indicates that score counts in team total

 Powerlifting 

Men

 Rowing 

Qualification Legend: FA=Final A (medal); FB=Final B (non-medal); R=Repechage

 Sailing *''' Due to a lack of wind Race 11 was cancelled

Shooting

Swimming

Table Tennis

See also
Ireland at the 2012 Summer Olympics
2012 Olympics gold post boxes in the United Kingdom

References

External links
Complete List of Irish Athletes at London 2012

Nations at the 2012 Summer Paralympics
2012
Paralympics